The election of Members of Parliament (MPs) to the Parliament of the Third Republic was held on 18 June 1979.

Current composition

List of MPs elected in the general election
The following table is a list of MPs elected on 18 June 1979, ordered by region and constituency. The previous MP and previous party column shows the MP and party holding the seat prior to the election.



By-elections
 Mampong North constituency - Akwasi Afrifa was executed on 26 June 1979, eight days after he was elected MP. In a by-election later, Ebenezer Augustus Kwasi Akuoko was elected to replace his vacant seat.

Notes and references

See also
1979 Ghanaian parliamentary election
Parliament of Ghana
Jacob Hackenbug Griffiths-Randolph - Speaker of the Parliament of the 3rd Republic.

1979